Olesno Town Hall - a Classical architectural style building built between 1820 and 1821, in the location of a former building from the seventeenth-century. The building was expanded in 1880, and in 1945 burnt down, and subsequently rebuilt after World War II. Currently, the office space in the town hall is rented.

References

Olesno County
City and town halls in Poland